The canton of Pontchâteau is an administrative division of the Loire-Atlantique department, western France. Its borders were modified at the French canton reorganisation which came into effect in March 2015. Its seat is in Pontchâteau.

It consists of the following communes:
 
Avessac
Crossac
Drefféac
Fégréac
Guenrouet
Missillac
Plessé
Pontchâteau
Sainte-Anne-sur-Brivet
Sainte-Reine-de-Bretagne
Saint-Gildas-des-Bois
Saint-Nicolas-de-Redon
Sévérac

References

Cantons of Loire-Atlantique